Hemant Lall (born 1951 in India) is an American bridge player from Nottingham and Dallas, Texas. His son, Justin Lall, was also a bridge player.

Bridge accomplishments

Wins

 North American Bridge Championships (6)
 von Zedtwitz Life Master Pairs (1) 1992 
 Freeman Mixed Board-a-Match (1) 2011 
 Grand National Teams (1) 2006 
 Chicago Mixed Board-a-Match (2) 2003, 2005 
 Spingold (1) 2007

Runners-up

 North American Bridge Championships
 von Zedtwitz Life Master Pairs (1) 2009 
 Rockwell Mixed Pairs (1) 1980 
 Nail Life Master Open Pairs (1) 2009 
 Keohane North American Swiss Teams (1) 2009 
 Spingold (1) 1993

Notes

External links
 

1951 births
Living people
American contract bridge players
Place of birth missing (living people)
Date of birth missing (living people)
People from Nottingham
American sportspeople of Indian descent
People from Houston